Lydia Katjita (born 15 October 1953 in Omatjete, Erongo Region, Namibia) is a former member of the National Assembly of Namibia and the Pan-African Parliament.

Biography
Lydia Katjita was born 15 October 1953 in Omatjete in the Erongo Region of central Namibia.  In 1989, she received a Higher Primary Education Certificate (HPEC) from the University of Namibia.  She acquired a B.A. from the University of South Africa in 1996 and enrolled in the Master of Educational Management and Administration program at the University of Namibia the next year.

From 1980 to the start of her national political career in 1999, Katjita was a teacher.  During this time, she held multiple other positions, including head of department for Sciences, Mathematics, English, and Afrikaans at the Ministry of Education in Grootfontein (1993–1999), member of the school board and management committee at Kalenga English Primary School (1993–1999), treasurer of the Evangelical Lutheran church in Grootfontein (1994–recent), chairperson of the Grootfontein Town Council (1995–1996), part-time teacher at the Namibian College of Open Learning (NAMCOL) in Grootfontein (1995–1999), and assistant researcher at the University of Namibia (1997).

Political career
Katjita became a member of the third National Assembly of Namibia in 2000 (representing SWAPO) and remained in office until after the November 2004 Namibian parliamentary election. She focused especially on legislation affecting rural areas and was a member of the standing committees on Human Resources and Gender Development and on Privileges and Reports of the Ombudsperson. In 2002, she was appointed chairman of a parliamentary sub-committee to accept nominations for the Nobel Peace Prize in Namibia.  Katjita was also a member of the Namibia branch of the Commonwealth Parliamentary Association and the Pan-African Parliament, where she was on the Justice and Human Rights Committee and the Pan-African Parliamentary Women Caucus.  In July 2005, she was appointed secretary for administration and finance of the Pan African Women’s organization.

References

External links
Parliament of Namibia
Members of the 3rd National Assembly of the Republic of Namibia, 1999-2004
Pan-African Parliament

1953 births
Living people
People from Erongo Region
SWAPO politicians
Members of the National Assembly (Namibia)
Members of the Pan-African Parliament from Namibia
University of Namibia alumni
21st-century Namibian women politicians
21st-century Namibian politicians
Women members of the National Assembly (Namibia)
Women members of the Pan-African Parliament